South-East Asia Japan Cable System (SJC) is a pan-Asia submarine communications cable system connecting Japan, China, Hong Kong, the Philippines, Brunei, Thailand, Singapore and Indonesia in Asia. The SJC cable consists of 6 fiber pairs, with an initial design capacity of over 15 Tbit/s which can be upgraded to 23 Tbit/s. The SJC cable system utilizes the state-of-the-art advanced 40G SLTE and OADM Branching technologies.   The SJC is operational on June 27, 2013.

Cable landing stations 
It will have cable landing points at:
 Mainland China (at Shantou)
 Hong Kong (at Chung Hom Kok)
 Viet Nam 
 Japan (at Chikura)
 Philippines (at Nasugbu, Batangas)
 Brunei (at Telisai)
 Thailand (at Songkhla)
 Singapore (at Tuas)

References 

Submarine communications cables
2013 establishments in Asia